is the westernmost of the Fuji Five Lakes and located on the border of the towns of Fujikawaguchiko and Minobu in southern Yamanashi Prefecture near Mount Fuji, Japan.

The remnants of the lava flow are now under the Aokigahara Jukai Forest, and there is evidence to indicate that these three lakes remain connected by underground waterways. The temperature of the water never drops below , making it the only one of the Fuji Five Lakes that does not freeze in winter.

The lake is within the borders of the Fuji-Hakone-Izu National Park.

As with the other Fuji Five Lakes, the area is a popular resort, with many lakeside hotels, windsurfing facilities, camp sites, and excursion boats. Rainbow trout and brown trout were introduced to the lake in the Meiji period, and sports fishing is also popular. However, in recent years, reduced water transparency due to pollution from these activities has been a growing issue.

The lake and its view of Mount Fuji were featured on Series D of the Japanese 5000-yen note and Series E of the Japanese 1000-yen note.

In popular culture
In Inuyasha the Movie: The Castle Beyond the Looking Glass, in the Sengoku period, the lake has a mountain castle led by a daiyōkai Princess Kaguya, as according to Akitoki Hōjō that a saying a priest told his family once that the castle in the lake is "unreachable by mortals", and Inuyasha's Robe of the Fire-rat as fire is in this lake to undo Monk Miyatsu's seal to free Kaguya out of Mirror of Life.
 Lake Motosu features prominently in the anime series Laid-Back Camp. Visitor numbers rose after the first season aired.

Gallery

See also

 Fuji Five Lakes
 Fuji-Hakone-Izu National Park

References 
Rafferty, John P. Plate Tectonics, Volcanoes, and Earthquakes. Rosen Publishing (2010),

Notes

External links 

Map　
 home page

Motosu
Tourist attractions in Yamanashi Prefecture
Landforms of Yamanashi Prefecture
Mount Fuji
Fuji-Hakone-Izu National Park
Fujikawaguchiko, Yamanashi
Minobu, Yamanashi